Adam Húska (born 12 May 1997) is a Slovak ice hockey goaltender who plays for Torpedo Nizhny Novgorod of the Kontinental Hockey League (KHL).

Playing career
Húska moved to North American hockey during the 2014–15 season when he began playing with the Green Bay Gamblers of the United States Hockey League and was drafted in the seventh round of the 2015 NHL Entry Draft by the New York Rangers. After spending the 2015–16 season with the Gamblers, Húska began playing for UConn. He spent three seasons at UConn, going 20-38-8 with a 2.90 GAA and a save percentage of .908. 

Húska signed a contract with the Rangers after the 2018–19 season with UConn. Between 2019 and 2021 Húska primarily played with the Hartford Wolf Pack of the American Hockey League, and he also appeared with the Maine Mariners of the ECHL and HKM Zvolen of the Slovak Extraliga.

After beginning the season with the Hartford Wolf Pack, Húska made his NHL debut for the New York Rangers on 8 December 2021 against the Colorado Avalanche.

As a free agent from the Rangers, he signed a one-year contract with Russian club, Torpedo Nizhny Novgorod of the KHL, for the 2022–23 season.

International play
He was selected to make his full IIHF international debut, participating for Slovakia in the 2021 IIHF World Championship.

Career statistics

Regular season and playoffs

International

References

External links
 

1997 births
Living people
Green Bay Gamblers players
Hartford Wolf Pack players
Maine Mariners players
New York Rangers draft picks
HKM Zvolen players
New York Rangers players
Sportspeople from Zvolen
Slovak expatriate ice hockey players in the United States
Slovak ice hockey goaltenders
Torpedo Nizhny Novgorod players
UConn Huskies men's ice hockey players
Slovak expatriate ice hockey players in Russia